Richard John Colangelo (April 14, 1957 – March 10, 2007), better known by his stage name Richard Jeni, was an American stand-up comedian and actor.

Early life
Jeni was born and raised in an Italian-American Roman Catholic family in Bensonhurst, Brooklyn. He graduated with honors from Hunter College, earning a bachelor's degree in comparative politics. After graduating, Jeni went on to do public relations work, but was let go from five different firms in two years before doing an open-mic night in Brooklyn and deciding to pursue standup comedy as a career in 1982.

Career
Jeni first received recognition through a series of Showtime stand-up specials and frequent appearances on The Tonight Show. After making his Tonight Show debut in 1988 with Johnny Carson, Jeni returned often and later made appearances on The Tonight Show with Jay Leno, with more appearances than any other stand-up comedian. In 1989, he won Comedy USA's Best Nightclub Comedian, as voted by comedy club owners and comedians, and his first Showtime special Richard Jeni: The Boy From New York City won a CableACE Award.

Top executives at HBO picked up his first appearance on The HBO Comedy Hour in 1992, titled Richard Jeni: Platypus Man. The show was well received, and Jeni returned for two more shows, going on to receive another CableACE Award for one of his HBO specials. Jeni starred in the short-lived 1995 UPN sitcom Platypus Man and appeared in the Jim Carrey film The Mask. Jeni composed the theme song ("I'm A Platypus Man") for his TV series. He appeared in The Aristocrats, Dad's Week Off, An Alan Smithee Film: Burn Hollywood Burn, and Chasing Robert. He starred in commercial campaigns for Certs and Arby's, and he won a Clio Award for his work as a writer/performer in an advertising campaign for the American Dairy Association.

In 2004, Jeni was ranked #57 on Comedy Central's list of the 100 Greatest Stand-ups of All Time.

Death
On March 10, 2007, Jeni was found by his girlfriend, Amy Murphy, a weather anchor and reporter for KTTV in Los Angeles, with a .38-caliber Colt Detective Special between his feet and an apparent self-inflicted handgun wound to the head on the bathroom floor in his West Hollywood, California home. Jeni and Murphy had been conversing in bed, discussing breakfast and their plans for the day, when Murphy left to cook breakfast downstairs. After a few minutes, she heard the sound of a gunshot, ran upstairs, discovered Jeni's condition, and called 9-1-1.

Police and paramedics arrived and transported Jeni to Cedars-Sinai Medical Center in Los Angeles, where he died. His family later stated with certainty that the death was a suicide and that Jeni had recently been diagnosed with "severe clinical depression coupled with fits of psychotic paranoia." According to the coroner's report released in June 2007, Jeni had a history of schizophrenia and had been taking antidepressants and a sleeping aid. The report further indicated that his girlfriend heard him talking to himself about a week earlier, saying "just squeeze the trigger."

Jeni's death was marked by many tributes, including thousands of messages on his website and YouTube as well as on the radio. On March 12, 2007, Jeni's death was mentioned on The Tonight Show by Jay Leno, with accompanying footage of Jeni's last appearance on the show. On March 16, Bill Maher, who had performed with Jeni as a young comic, dedicated the fifth episode of the fifth season of his HBO show, Real Time with Bill Maher, to Jeni and discussed his death on Larry King Live.

Filmography 
 Bird (1988) as Morello
 The Mask (1994) as Charlie Schumaker
 Dad's Week Off (1997) as Bernie
 An Alan Smithee Film: Burn Hollywood Burn (1998) as Jerry Glover
 Chasing Robert (2007) as Rich the Bookie

Television series 
 Dr. Katz, Professional Therapist (1995-2002) as Himself
 Platypus Man (1995) as himself
 Shorties Watchin' Shorties (2004) as himself

HBO specials 
 Richard Jeni: Platypus Man (1993)
 Richard Jeni: A Good Catholic Boy (1997)
 Richard Jeni: A Big Steaming Pile of Me (2005)

Showtime specials 
 Richard Jeni: Boy from New York City (1989)
 Richard Jeni: Crazy from The Heat (1991)

Other works 
 OfficeMax commercial (voice) (1995-1999)
 Certs commercial
Coca-Cola commercial for concession stands at the movie theater 1997

References

External links 

 
 
 

1957 births
2007 deaths
American male film actors
American people of Italian descent
American stand-up comedians
Television personalities from New York City
Hunter College alumni
Male actors from New York (state)
People from Bensonhurst, Brooklyn
People with mood disorders
Suicides by firearm in California
Comedians from New York (state)
20th-century American comedians
21st-century American comedians
20th-century American male actors
Burials in New York (state)
2007 suicides